Nickel Centre (1996 census population 13,017) was a town in Ontario, Canada, which existed from 1973 to 2000.

It was created as part of the Regional Municipality of Sudbury. On January 1, 2001, the town and the Regional Municipality were dissolved and amalgamated into the city of Greater Sudbury. The town is now divided between Wards 7 and 9 on Greater Sudbury City Council, and is represented by councillors Mike Jakubo and Deb McIntosh.

In the Canada 2011 Census, the Garson-Falconbridge corridor within Nickel Centre was counted as part of the population centre (or urban area) of Sudbury, while the census tracts corresponding to the former boundaries of Nickel Centre had a population of 13,232. In the Canada 2016 Census, the boundaries of the Sudbury population centre were revised to retain Garson but exclude Falconbridge, while a new population centre was added for Coniston (population 1,814).

Communities

Coniston

Coniston was a part of the geographic Neelon Township, which was named after Sylvester Neelon. The first settlers in the Coniston area were the Butler family, who arrived in 1902. They were joined by five other families by 1904, who created their own farms. Common crops included hay, rye, and oats. The Canadian Northern Railway (a predecessor of the Canadian National Railway) arrived in 1905, with Coniston lying along its transcontinental line. It was joined in 1908 by the Canadian Pacific Railway, which constructed a new direct line linking Sudbury and Toronto via Romford Junction. The population had risen to 20 families during this period and settlers requested the establishment of a local post office, which had to be named; the name Neelon was originally considered, but Dennis O'Brien, a local settler who became the first postmaster, decided on the name Coniston after it was suggested to him by T. Johnson, a railway construction superintendent who had been reading a novel set in the village of Coniston in the Lake District of England.

The Mond Nickel Company arrived in Coniston in 1913, relocating its smelter operations from the earlier settlement of Victoria Mines (located west of Sudbury), which swiftly became a ghost town. Coniston was chosen due to its more favourable rail connections and terrain. As part of the relocation, Mond purchased five family farms totalling , which "brought an end to the agricultural orientation of the community." Coniston was re-established as a Mond company town, with many existing company houses being relocated from Victoria Mines, along with the provision of a modern planned town with a street grid, sidewalks, and a water distribution system.

Coniston was subsequently incorporated under the provisions of the Municipal Act by Ontario Municipal Board Order A4741 on January 1, 1934, and remained such until the establishment of regional government. Prior to its annexation into Nickel Centre, the town's mayors were Edgar Taylor Austin (1934–46), Roy Snitch (1947–52), Walter Kilimnik (1953–57), William Evershed (1958-59), Maurice Beauchemin (1960–62) and Mike Solski (1963-72). Solski, the final mayor of Coniston as an independent town, won election to the mayoralty of the amalgamated town of Nickel Centre in 1972.

Notable residents of Coniston have included hockey players Neal Martin, Noel Price, Toe Blake, Jim Fox, Leo Lafrance, Andy Barbe and Randy Boyd as well as many other great hockey players. Coniston also includes the smaller neighbourhood of Austin, which may also be known as Old Coniston. This area borders Highway 17 and is home to a baseball field. The baseball field was abandoned and decommissioned prior to 2000 when Coniston became part of Greater Sudbury.

Falconbridge

The geographic township of Falconbridge was named in the 1880s for William Glenholm Falconbridge, a justice of the High Court of Ontario. The original settlement in the township was a small lumber camp.

A significant ore body was discovered in 1902 by Thomas Edison near what is now Falconbridge's Centennial Park. The Edison Ore-Milling Company was unsuccessful in establishing a mining operation, and abandoned his original claim in 1903. The claim reverted to Crown land until the Longyear Drilling Company bought it in 1911. Longyear subsequently merged with other small mining companies in the area to form the basis of what would ultimately become Falconbridge Ltd., although actual mining operations in the community did not begin until 1928, when Thayer Lindsley purchased the company for $2,500,000 and finally sunk the Falconbridge deposit's first mine shaft the following year.

Falconbridge Ltd. built the Edison Building in 1969 to serve as its head office. Falconbridge Ltd. was taken over by Swiss mining company Xstrata in 2006. In 2007, Xstrata donated the Edison Building to the city to serve as the new home of the municipal archives.

Falconbridge was incorporated as a town in 1957. The town's first and only reeve, John Franklin, served until the creation of Nickel Centre in 1973.

A visual and radar UFO incident occurred in the community on November 11, 1975, later reported in a press release by NORAD. The object was tracked on radar from CFS Falconbridge and sighted in binoculars, and estimated to be a 100-ft. diameter sphere with craters. Seven OPP police officers also witnessed the UFO. Some explanations given for the sightings included Venus, clouds, and/or weather balloons.

Garson

The community is named after the geographic township of Garson, named by the Ontario Government in the 1880s for William Garson, who represented Lincoln in the Legislative Assembly of Ontario from 1886 to 1890.

The area was first developed in 1888 as a logging camp, by the Holland and Emery Lumber Company of East Tawas, Michigan. In that year this firm constructed a narrow gauge logging railway from Wahnapitae, establishing its main operations at Headquarters Lake, near the Garson townsite. Logs from this area were taken to the Wanapitei River and driven to Lake Huron. Eventually this track was extended north into Capreol Township.

The Canadian Northern Railway was built through Garson in 1908.

Garson Mine, which is now owned by Vale Inco was first developed in 1911 by the Mond Nickel Company. The defunct Kirkwood Mine was also located in Garson.

Skead

Skead is located approximately 25 kilometres northeast of downtown Sudbury, and situated on south shore of Lake Wanapitei. Home to over 600 year round residents, Skead was settled about 1921 as a sawmill community, when the Spanish River Lumber Company relocated there from its original mill site, near the mouth of the Spanish River. It was named by the firm's general manager W. J. Bell, in honour of his late father-in-law, Canadian Senator James Skead. Skead was a stop on the Canadian Northern Railway line from Capreol to North Bay, which later became the Canadian National Railway Alderdale Subdivision, but rail service declined in the mid-20th century and was eliminated altogether in 1996.

Boland's Bay
Skead's address and telephone service also includes the smaller neighbourhood of Boland's Bay, a dispersed rural community and unincorporated place, on the eponymous bay at the southwestern tip of Lake Wanapitei. The community was known as Bowlands Bay and the bay as Bowland Bay until 1975 when the present spellings were adopted. However, the old spelling continues on the local street Bowlands Bay Road. Boland's Bay (spelled Bowlands Bay in older timetables) was a milepoint on the Canadian Northern Railway line from Capreol to North Bay, which later became the Canadian National Railway Alderdale Subdivision, but rail service declined in the mid-20th century and was eliminated altogether in 1996.

Wahnapitae
The community takes its name from the Wanapitei River, which flows through Wahnapitae, and whose name in turn comes from the Ojibwe word waanabidebiing, which means "concave-tooth [shaped] water" and describes the shape of Lake Wanapitei. The correct spelling of the community's name should not be confused with the correct spelling for the water bodies.

The community of Wahnapitae is located east of Sudbury along Highway 17. It was the first settlement to be established in Nickel Centre and was supposed to be the main community within the Sudbury district because it was located along a major waterway. Originally, it was thought that Sudbury would be just a small settlement in the area, but with the discovery of ore and a shift from logging to mining, Sudbury became the focal point of the district and Wahnapitae was relegated to a smaller role.

In the early days of the town, logging was the major industry of the area. Many lumber companies established their operations along the Wanapitei River and the river itself was used to send the harvested logs to Southern Ontario for processing. Workers and their families, as well as various entrepreneurs, established a community along the river bank that was eventually known as Wahnapitae. In its heyday, Wahnapitae was a large, booming community that boasted a number of banks, general stores, clothing stores, hotels, and various other enterprises. It also possessed its own separate school (St. Peter) and public school (Wahnapitae Public School) and even had a water tower and a train station (it was located along the East West main line of the Canadian Pacific Railway).

As the number of viable trees for harvesting dwindled and mining began to take hold, the community of Wahnapitae lost its momentum. Suddenly, people were choosing mining towns over Wahnapitae and eventually the town became a shadow of its former glory. Wahnapitae remained an unorganized township until the amalgamation of the Regional Municipality of Sudbury in 1973 and in 2001, it became part of the City of Greater Sudbury.  The town that began as a logging and farming settlement is today mostly a residential community.

The community should not be confused with the Wahnapitae First Nation.

Ghost town

Happy Valley
The ghost town of Happy Valley, originally known as Spruce Valley, was first inhabited in 1906 by workers from the nearby mine at Garson.  Not wanting to live in a state of dependency in the company town, they built this smaller town of humble shacks with narrow streets. In 1930, the Garson Mine shut down, and the workers were transferred to the mines at Falconbridge.

However, due to temperature inversions, the smelter at Falconbridge created severe pollution problems in Happy Valley, as heavy sulphur emissions from the smelter would become trapped in the valley.  For years, workers suspected that they were being poisoned by pollution, and these fears were confirmed in the 1960s and 1970s as society grew more environmentally-conscious.  For several years, the community reached a deal with Falconbridge that the smelter would not operate on days when a north wind was blowing.

By the early 1970s, the roughly one hundred people who lived in Happy Valley were still suffering daily from air pollution produced by the nearby operations of Falconbridge Nickel Mines Limited (FNM). After years of pressure to do something about this situation, in the early 1970s the Ontario government facilitated the abandonment of Happy Valley in cooperation with the Regional Municipality of Sudbury and FNM. The controversial decision made headlines; it was the first instance in which the provincial government financed the relocation of an entire community because of air pollution. Most Happy Valley residents had accepted compensation for their homes and moved away by the mid-1970s, although at least one resident refused to sell his property and remained in the area until the late-1980s. Today, the ghost town is off limits to the general public and protected by a large barbed-wire fence.

Transportation
The Greater Sudbury Airport, the city's main airport, is located in Nickel Centre approximately halfway between Falconbridge and Skead, although its official mailing address is in Garson.

Highway 17, the main route of the Trans-Canada Highway, passes through Coniston and Wahnapitae. Highway 17's freeway segment in the Walden area is slated to be expanded through Nickel Centre toward Markstay, along the existing Southwest and Southeast Bypass route and thence on a new alignment past Coniston and Wahnapitae.

References

External links
 The Coniston Story
 The role of Thomas Edison in the establishment of Falconbridge at Greater Sudbury Heritage Museums
 History of Nickel Centre at Greater Sudbury Heritage Museums

Neighbourhoods in Greater Sudbury
Populated places established in 1973
Former towns in Ontario
Populated places disestablished in 2000